| past_members    =

Madame Monsieur is a French duo consisting of vocalist Émilie Satt and producer Jean-Karl Lucas. They represented France at the Eurovision Song Contest 2018 in Lisbon, Portugal with the song "Mercy", finishing in 13th place in the grand final.

History
Émilie Satt and Jean-Karl Lucas first met in 2008, and formed Madame Monsieur in 2013. In 2015, they composed the song "Smile" for the French rapper Youssoupha, and later participated in Taratata. The duo released their debut album Tandem on 27 June 2020.

On 1 January 2018, they were confirmed to be taking part in Destination Eurovision, the French national selection for the Eurovision Song Contest 2018 with the song "Mercy". They qualified from the second semi-final on 20 January to the final held on 27 January. In the final, they placed third with the international juries and first with the French public, amassing enough combined points to win the competition. They represented France in the Eurovision Song Contest 2018 held in Lisbon, Portugal, ultimately coming in thirteenth place. As well as receiving the Marcel Bezençon Press Award, they were also the runner-up of the OGAE fan vote, just behind actual winner Netta Barzilai of Israel.

In 2018, they provided French commentary for France 2 at that year's Junior Eurovision Song Contest alongside Stéphane Bern. In 2019, they co-wrote the song Roi alongside Bilal Hassani. The song represented France at the Eurovision Song Contest 2019 in Tel Aviv, Israel finishing in 16th place.

Musical style
The group's musical style has been likened by The Huffington Post to  avant-pop singer-songwriter Christine and The Queens.

Members
 Émilie Satt — lead vocals
 Jean-Karl Lucas — production, backing vocals

Discography

Albums

Singles

References

External links

2013 establishments in France
Eurovision Song Contest entrants of 2018
Eurovision Song Contest entrants for France
French pop music groups
French musical duos
Musical groups established in 2013
Pop music duos
Male–female musical duos